Michelle Day is an American attorney and politician from Oklahoma. Day served as the 31st Oklahoma Secretary of State, having been appointed by Governor Mary Fallin to serve in an interim position following the resignation of Glenn Coffee. Fallin then appointed Larry Parman.

Day earned a degree in accounting from Central State University and a Juris Doctor from the University of Oklahoma. Previously, she had served as deputy state auditor, an assistant district attorney general, general counsel for the Oklahoma Department of Central Services, and assistant chief counsel and associate counsel for the Oklahoma Department of Public Safety.

Day currently works as an attorney in Oklahoma City.

Note

References

External links

Living people
Politicians from Oklahoma City
Secretaries of State of Oklahoma
Heads of Oklahoma state agencies
Year of birth missing (living people)
University of Oklahoma alumni
Central State University alumni
21st-century American politicians
21st-century American women politicians